Riverton was a parliamentary electorate in the Southland region of New Zealand.

Population centres
The electorate included the town of Riverton.

History
Riverton existed from 1866 to 1881. Hankinson resigned on 2 April 1870, before the end of the parliamentary term.

McGillivray was defeated at the 1876 election by Dr Samuel Hodgkinson. At the end of the parliamentary term in 1881, McCaughen retired and the electorate was abolished.

Election results
The electorate was represented by four Members of Parliament:

Key

Notes

References

Historical electorates of New Zealand
Politics of Southland, New Zealand
1865 establishments in New Zealand
1881 disestablishments in New Zealand